{{DISPLAYTITLE:Gq alpha subunit}}

Gq protein alpha subunit is a family of heterotrimeric G protein alpha subunits. This family is also commonly called the Gq/11 (Gq/G11) family or Gq/11/14/15 family to include closely related family members. G alpha subunits may be referred to as Gq alpha, Gαq, or Gqα. 
Gq proteins couple to G protein-coupled receptors to activate beta-type phospholipase C (PLC-β) enzymes. PLC-β in turn hydrolyzes phosphatidylinositol 4,5-bisphosphate (PIP2) to diacyl glycerol (DAG) and inositol trisphosphate (IP3). IP3 acts as a second messenger to release stored calcium into the cytoplasm, while DAG acts as a second messenger that activates protein kinase C (PKC).

Family members 
In humans, there are four distinct proteins in the Gq alpha subunit family: 
 Gαq is encoded by the gene GNAQ.
 Gα11 is encoded by the gene GNA11.
 Gα14 is encoded by the gene GNA14.
 Gα15 is encoded by the gene GNA15.

Function 

The general function of Gq is to activate intracellular signaling pathways in response to activation of cell surface  G protein-coupled receptors (GPCRs). GPCRs function as part of a three-component system of receptor-transducer-effector. The transducer in this system is a heterotrimeric G protein, composed of three subunits: a Gα protein such as Gαq, and a complex of two tightly linked proteins called Gβ and Gγ in a Gβγ complex. When not stimulated by a receptor, Gα is bound to guanosine diphosphate (GDP) and to Gβγ to form the inactive G protein trimer. When the receptor binds an activating ligand outside the cell (such as a hormone or neurotransmitter), the activated receptor acts as a guanine nucleotide exchange factor to promote GDP release from and guanosine triphosphate (GTP) binding to Gα, which drives dissociation of GTP-bound Gα from Gβγ. Recent evidence suggests that Gβγ and Gαq-GTP could maintain partial interaction via the N-α-helix region of Gαq. GTP-bound Gα and Gβγ are then freed to activate their respective downstream signaling enzymes.

Gq/11/14/15 proteins all activate beta-type phospholipase C (PLC-β) to signal through calcium and PKC signaling pathways. PLC-β then cleaves a specific plasma membrane phospholipid, phosphatidylinositol 4,5-bisphosphate (PIP2) into diacyl glycerol (DAG) and inositol 1,4,5-trisphosphate (IP3). DAG remains bound to the membrane, and IP3 is released as a soluble molecule into the cytoplasm. IP3 diffuses to bind to IP3 receptors, a specialized calcium channel in the endoplasmic reticulum (ER). These channels are specific to calcium and only allow the passage of calcium from the ER into the cytoplasm. Since cells actively sequester calcium in the ER to keep cytoplasmic levels low, this release causes the cytosolic concentration of calcium to increase, causing a cascade of intracellular changes and activity through calcium binding proteins and calcium-sensitive processes.

 Further reading: Calcium function in vertebrates

DAG works together with released calcium to activate specific isoforms of PKC, which are activated to phosphorylate other molecules, leading to further altered cellular activity.

 Further reading: function of protein kinase C

The Gαq / Gα11 (Q209L) mutation is associated with the development of uveal melanoma and its pharmacological inhibition (cyclic depsipeptide FR900359 inhibitor), decreases tumor growth in preclinical trials.

Receptors 
The following G protein-coupled receptors couple to Gq subunits:

 5-HT2 serotonergic receptors
 Alpha-1 adrenergic receptor
 Vasopressin type 1 receptors: 1A and 1B
 Angiotensin II receptor type 1
 Calcitonin receptor
 Histamine H1 receptor
 Metabotropic glutamate receptor, Group I
 M1, M3, and  M5 muscarinic receptors
 Trace amine-associated receptor 1

At least some Gq-coupled receptors (e.g., the muscarinic acetylcholine M3 receptor) can be found preassembled (pre-coupled) with Gq. The common polybasic domain in the C-tail of Gq-coupled receptors appears necessary for this receptor¬G protein preassembly.

See also 
 Second messenger system
 G protein-coupled receptor
 Heterotrimeric G protein
 Phospholipase C
 Calcium signaling
 Protein kinase C
 Gs alpha subunit
 Gi alpha subunit
 G12/G13 alpha subunits

References

External links 
 

G proteins
Peripheral membrane proteins